TAIP may refer to:
 Taiwan Independence Party, a left-wing political party in Taiwan
 Transportes Aéreos da Índia Portuguesa
 Trimble ASCII Interface Protocol, a communications protocol for Global Positioning Systems
 YES, a political party in Lithuania